Radiation Island is an action-adventure and survival game by California-based developer Atypical Games. It was initially released on iOS and MacOS on January 29, 2015, and later also published on Microsoft Windows and Android on November 29, 2016, as well as Nintendo Switch on February 22, 2018. Gameplay in Radiation Island features elements of exploration, crafting, combat, and survival. Also multiplayer can be unlocked after completing the game.

Reception
The mobile version of the game received generally mixed to positive reviews from critics, garnering a Metacritic score of 79/100 based on 8 reviews. It was praised for its visuals, immersive gameplay, creative mechanics, and lack of in-app purchases. It did get criticized for the "unfinishness" and lack of direction. The Nintendo Switch version of the game received worse reviews in comparison, holding a Metacritic score of 54/100 based on 7 reviews.

References

External links 
 Official website

2015 video games
Action-adventure games
IOS games
Nintendo Switch games
Single-player video games
Survival video games
Video games developed in the United States
Video games set on islands
Windows games